Simon Timothy Cook MBE is a British television actor, best known for his role as Andrew Warrington in the Five soap opera Family Affairs between 2000 and 2001.

Biography
He attended Norwich School before studying English at the University of Sussex. He spent six years in business management before taking an acting course at the Bristol Old Vic Theatre School.

Cook has had roles in EastEnders, Doctors, Casualty, and Cal. He has also performed with the Royal Shakespeare Company.

Politics
He is also a Liberal Democrat politician, being a member of Bristol City Council since 1999, representing the Clifton East ward. He has served as Cabinet Member for Culture and Leisure (2003–2004, 2005–2007 and 2009–present), as Lord Mayor of Bristol (2004–2005) and as Deputy Leader of Council (2005–2006 and 2009–2012). As of 8 May 2012, he was the leader of the Liberal Democrat Group and also Leader of the council. In November 2012, the position of Leader of the council was to be replaced by a directly elected Mayor of Bristol. Which was won by Bristol 1st member George Ferguson.

Cook is the director of a small company that makes video and audio podcasts.

Filmography

References

External links
 

Living people
British male television actors
Liberal Democrats (UK) councillors
Mayors of Bristol
People educated at Norwich School
1972 births
Leaders of local authorities of England